The Hobe Sound National Wildlife Refuge, a part of the United States National Wildlife Refuge System, is a refuge on Jupiter Island in Florida. Its official name as of 2019 is the Nathaniel P. Reed Hobe Sound National Wildlife Refuge. Part of the refuge is inside the town of Jupiter Island, while the rest is in the unincorporated areas of Martin County. The  refuge was established in 1969, to protect the loggerhead and green sea turtles. It is administered as part of the Arthur R. Marshall Loxahatchee National Wildlife Refuge.

Within the refuge is the  Reed Wilderness Seashore Sanctuary, designated a National Natural Landmark in November 1967.

Beach erosion

According to the Florida Department of Environmental Protection, a significant amount of coastal erosion in Florida is directly attributable to the construction and maintenance of navigation inlets.

U.S. Fish and Wildlife

Hobe Sound National Wildlife Refuge was established September 30, 1969. It is a coastal refuge bisected by the Indian River Lagoon into two separate tracts of land totaling over 1000 acres. The  Jupiter Island tract provides some of the most productive sea turtle nesting habitat in the United States, and the  sand pine scrub mainland tract is valued because more than 90 percent of this community type has been lost to development in Florida. Sand pine scrub habitat is restricted only to Florida and an adjacent county in Alabama.

Hobe Sound Nature Center

The Hobe Sound Nature Center is a private non-profit nature center that cooperates with the U.S. Fish and Wildlife Service to conduct environmental education and awareness programs about the Hobe Sound National Wildlife Refuge.  The center was founded in 1973 by and continues to receive major support from the Jupiter Island Garden Club.

References

External links

 Nathaniel P. Reed Hobe Sound National Wildlife Refuge - official site
 HSNWR Beach Webcam
 Hobe Sound Nature Center

Protected areas of Martin County, Florida
National Natural Landmarks in Florida
National Wildlife Refuges in Florida
Protected areas established in 1969
Nature centers in Florida